Spiniphallellus fuscescens is a moth of the family Gelechiidae. It was described by Oleksiy V. Bidzilya and Ole Karsholt in 2008. It is found in north-eastern Turkey.

The wingspan is 14–15 mm.

Etymology
The species name refers to the uniform dark brown forewing and is derived from Latin fuscus (meaning dark).

References

Moths described in 2008
Anomologini